Owl City is an American electronica project created in 2007 in Owatonna, Minnesota; it is one of the several projects by singer, songwriter and multi-instrumentalist Adam Young. Young created the project while experimenting with music in his parents' basement. Owl City developed a following on the social networking site MySpace, like many musicians who achieved success in the late 2000s, before signing with Universal Republic Records, now Republic Records, in 2008.

Owl City issued its debut release, the extended play Of June, in September 2007; it peaked at number 15 on the United States Billboard Dance/Electronic Albums chart. His debut studio album Maybe I'm Dreaming followed in December 2008, peaking at number 13 on the Dance/Electronic Albums chart. Following the success of Of June and Maybe I'm Dreaming, Young signed to Universal Republic Records in late 2008. His second studio album and major-label debut, Ocean Eyes, was released in July 2009. "Fireflies", the album's lead single, became an international success, peaking at number one on the US Billboard Hot 100 and becoming a top ten hit in several other countries. Fueled by success of "Fireflies", Ocean Eyes peaked at number eight on the US Billboard 200 and was later certified platinum by the Recording Industry Association of America (RIAA). An additional three singles were released from the album: "Vanilla Twilight", "Hello Seattle" and "Umbrella Beach".

Owl City's third studio album All Things Bright and Beautiful was released in June 2011, peaking at number six on the Billboard 200 and selling 143,000 copies. The album produced six singles, with "Alligator Sky" and "Lonely Lullaby" managing to chart on the US Billboard Bubbling Under Hot 100 Singles chart. "Good Time", a collaboration with Canadian recording artist Carly Rae Jepsen, peaked at number eight on the Billboard Hot 100 and became a top ten chart hit in countries such as Australia, Canada and the United Kingdom. Owl City released his fourth studio album The Midsummer Station in August 2012; it peaked at number seven on the Billboard 200. On July 10, 2015, Owl City released his fifth album, titled Mobile Orchestra, spawning the singles "You're Not Alone", "Verge" and "Unbelievable".

Released songs

References

Owl City